Piddubny, Piddubnyi, or Poddubny is a surname. Notable people with the surname include:
 Dmytro Piddubnyi (born 2000), Ukrainian footballer
 Igor Piddubny (born 1965), Ukrainian journalist
 Maryna Piddubna (born 1998), Ukrainian Paralympic swimmer
 Volodymyr Piddubnyy, Ukrainian Paralympic athlete
 Aleksandr Poddubny (born 1960), Kyrgyzstani fencer
 Ivan Poddubny (1871–1949), Soviet wrestler
 Viktor Poddubny (born 1965), Soviet judoka
 Walt Poddubny (1960–2009), Canadian ice hockey player

Related surnames

See also
 
 

Ukrainian-language surnames